Jan Gniński (died c.1685) was a Polish diplomat, Treasurer of the Crown Court.  He was Vice-Chancellor of the Crown from 1681, voivode of Malbork in 1681, governor from 1668 to 1680 of Chelm and was an MP in the Sejm. He participated in the Polish-Swedish wars and the Siege of Vienna (1683) and was known to be an Ambassador to Turkey.

Jan Gniński was married to Dorota Jaskólska. They had five children:
Jan Chryzostom Benedykt
Jan Krzysztof, voivode of Pomorze
Władysław
Anna Franciszka
Konstancja Dorota (d. 1705)

References

17th-century Polish politicians
Polish diplomats
1685 deaths
Year of birth unknown
Crown Vice-Chancellors